Thomas Patrick O'Dea (born March 31, 1967) is an American attorney and representative in the Connecticut House of Representatives representing the 125th District, encompassing parts of Wilton and New Canaan. He is a member of the Republican Party and the House Republican Caucus.

Early life and education 
O'Dea was born to Thomas Patrick O'Dea, Sr. (1940-2022), a physician, and Madalene Maddy (née Wiggins) in Philadelphia, Pennsylvania. He was raised in an Irish Catholic family in Chadds Ford, Pennsylvania. He completed his undergraduate studies at Providence College in Providence, Rhode Island, graduating with a Bachelor of Arts (BA) in 1988. Between 1988 and 1991 he completed his Juris Doctor at the Columbus School of Law at the Catholic University of America in Washington, D.C. Between 1986 and 1987 he completed an exchange semester at the University of Fribourg in Fribourg, Switzerland.

Career 
He started his career interning at the US Embassy in Bern, Switzerland during his exchange semester in Fribourg in 1987. After returning to the US, he briefly worked for the US Department of Commerce and in the position of Law Clerk at the Executive Office of the President until 1990. In 1991, he entered the private law practice Halloran Sage in Westport, eventually becoming a partner. Since 2014, he has been a counsel for Diserio, Martin, O'Connor & Castiglione in Stamford.

Since 1995, he held various positions at the State of Connecticut. O'Dea served as a Victim Compensation Commissioner (1997-2004), a member of the Police Officer Standards and Training Council (1995-2004) and a member of the Judicial Selection Commission (2004-2007). He was an elected member of the town council of New Canaan, Connecticut between 2005 and 2012, as well as a board member of Staying Put in New Canaan, an association in age care. He was also a board treasurer for Voices of September 11, Inc. another non-profit.

Politics
In 2012, he ran for the State House and won, assuming office in 2013. He successfully ran for reelection in 2018 for his fourth 2-year term, defeating Democrat Ross Tartell in the November election. He ran unopposed in 2020 and began his 5th term in 2021.

Committee assignments 
Tom O'Dea serves on the following committees in the Connecticut House of Representatives:

Joint Committee on Judiciary
Transportation Committee
Joint Committee on Legislative Management
Environment Committee

Private 
O'Dea is married to Kerry (née McCarthy), a real estate agent.

They have three children; Thomas Tommy, Caroline and Michael. O'Dea is a resident of New Canaan, Connecticut.

References

Living people
People from New Canaan, Connecticut
Providence College alumni
Columbus School of Law alumni
University of Fribourg alumni
21st-century American politicians
Republican Party members of the Connecticut House of Representatives
Year of birth missing (living people)
American expatriates in Switzerland